Bramley & Wonersh was a railway station on the Cranleigh Line. It served the villages of Bramley and Wonersh in Surrey.

History

Opened in 1865 as "Bramley", its name was changed in June 1888 to "Bramley & Wonersh" as the station, although situated in Bramley, was only a short distance from Wonersh. A passing loop and a second platform were installed in 1876. The station was the last before the line joined the main line to Guildford at Peasmarsh Junction.

In the Second World War a German Dornier 217 aircraft attacked a train carrying Christmas shoppers as it was departing Bramley & Wonersh on 16 December 1942. The plane machine-gunned the train and dropped a bomb that exploded on the embankment, narrowly missing the train. The driver and guard were killed, a number of passengers were killed or wounded and the train was badly damaged. The fireman and the porter-in-charge of Bramley station attended the wounded and dying, later helped by six soldiers who were billetted nearby. Afterwards fireman William Fairey and porter-in-charge Violet Wisdom were presented with certificates of merit for their actions, and Miss Wisdom was singled out for her "great courage and resource directly the bombs had fallen".

The line was closed in 1965 following  The Reshaping of British Railways report of 1963, and the main station building was demolished a few years later. The trackbed remained overgrown for many years before being brought back into use in the 1980s as part of the Downs Link, a public footpath and bridleway linking the North Downs and South Downs National Trails. In 2004 major renovation works were carried out at the station by the local council and the Bramley Historical Society.

Future

Studies of the feasibility of reopening the Guildford – Bramley – Cranleigh section of the line were completed in 1994, 1997 and 2009. The 1994 report concluded that the investment required would not justify reinstatement, but Waverley Borough Council has protected the line from development in its Local Plan. The 2009 report estimates that reopening the Guildford – Bramley – Cranleigh section would have a positive benefit-cost ratio of 1.7 to 1 including capital costs.

Gallery

Other Cranleigh Line stations
 Guildford

See also
 List of closed railway stations in Britain

References

External links
 Bramley & Wonersh station on Subterranea Britannica
 Bramley & Wonersh station at cranleighrailway.info
 Witness account of the 1942 attack 

Disused railway stations in Surrey
Railway stations in Great Britain opened in 1865
Railway stations in Great Britain closed in 1965
Beeching closures in England
Former London, Brighton and South Coast Railway stations